Washington Township is one of twelve townships in Warren County, Indiana, United States. It is the most populous township in the county; according to the 2010 census, its population was 2,298, with 1,898 of those living in Williamsport, and it contained 1,011 housing units.

History
The area that became Washington Township was first settled in 1827.  Originally, the county was divided into four townships when it was formed in 1827; Washington Township was created a few years later in March 1830.

Geography
The Wabash River defines the township's southeastern border. Big Pine Creek flows through the far northeastern corner of the township on its way to the Wabash River. The streams of Clear Branch, Dry Branch, Fall Branch and Rock Creek also run through this township.

The county seat of Williamsport is in the east part of the township, near the river.  Williamsport Falls, the highest waterfall in the State of Indiana, is in downtown Williamsport; the stream of Fall Creek flows through the town and falls  over a sandstone ledge.

Cemeteries
The township contains these four cemeteries: Highland, Hillside, Owens and Robb.

Transportation
Indiana State Road 28 passes through the township from east to west.  Coming from the Illinois state line and West Lebanon, it goes directly east, then veers to the northeast and goes through Williamsport, then crosses the river and passes east through Attica in Fountain County.  U.S. Route 41 and State Road 55 pass through the northeastern corner of the township and briefly share the route of State Road 28.

A Norfolk Southern Railway line passes through the township from east to west, leaving the township when it also crosses the river.  For much of its route through the township, it parallels State Road 28, running just south of the highway.

Education
Washington Township is part of the Metropolitan School District of Warren County.  It contains one of the three elementary schools in the county, located in Williamsport.

Washington Township is served by the Williamsport-Washington Township Public Library.

Government
Washington Township has a trustee who administers rural fire protection and ambulance service, provides relief to the poor, manages cemetery care, and performs farm assessment, among other duties. The trustee is assisted in these duties by a three-member township board. The trustees and board members are elected to four-year terms.

Washington Township is part of Indiana's 8th congressional district, Indiana House of Representatives District 42, and Indiana State Senate District 23.

Climate and weather 

References

 
 United States Census Bureau TIGER/Line Shapefiles

Bibliography

External links

Townships in Warren County, Indiana
1830 establishments in Indiana
Populated places established in 1830
Townships in Indiana